The Stradivari Society is a philanthropic organization based in Chicago, Illinois, best known for its arranging deals between owners of antique string instruments such as those made by luthiers Antonio Stradivari and Giuseppe Guarneri, for use by talented musicians and performers. The Stradivari Society does not hold title to the instruments.

Background
The Society was founded by Geoffrey Fushi and Mary Galvin in 1985 when Galvin, wife of then-president of Motorola, Bob Galvin, was approached by Fushi and Robert Bein from Bein & Fushi of Chicago, to lend the Ruby Stradivarius of 1708 that he had previously sold to her to a promising violinist, Dylana Jenson. Seeing that such rare violins were very expensive and difficult to obtain, Galvin and Fushi designed the structure and name of the society after lending another violin when Dorothy DeLay of the Juilliard School asked Fushi for a violin for her most promising student, then ten-year-old Midori.  Enjoying the experience of lending such beautiful violins to those who could use them to grow and launch their careers, a string of loans followed.

Awardees include Joshua Bell, Gil Shaham, Paul Huang, Yi-Jia Susanne Hou, Leila Josefowicz, Philippe Quint, Sarah Chang, Janine Jansen, Vadim Repin, Kristóf Baráti, Hilary Hahn, Maxim Vengerov, and Paul Coletti, all of whom have enhanced their careers playing violins the Society arranged for them to borrow.

Loan program
The Society's two dozen patrons are each given tri-annual concerts by their sponsored musician during its three-year period. Each artist is responsible for insuring the instrument, and its delivery to The Society's curator, John Becker. Inspection and service is performed exclusively by Becker three times yearly, and cannot be done by any other luthier without permission. The instrument is often purchased by the artist from its patron, with The Society acting as liaison.

Recipients 

Antonio Stradivari
 Philippe Quint - Ruby, 1708
 Clara Jumi Kang - ex-Strauss, ca. 1708
 Vadim Gluzman – Auer, 1689
 Kristóf Baráti - Lady Harmsworth, 1703
 Augustin Hadelich – Kiesewetter, ca.. 1723
 Cecily Ward – Fleming, 1681
 Rugerro Allifranchini – Fetzer, 1694
 Gil Shaham – Comtesse de Polignac, 1699
 Frank Almond – Dushkin, 1701
 Berent Korfker – King Maximilian Joseph, ca. 1702
 Stefan Milenkovich – Lyall, 1702
 Tamaki Kawakubo – La Cathédrale, 1707
 Jeff Thayer – Burstein; Bagshawe, 1708
 Joshua Bell – Tom Taylor, 1732
 Janine Jansen – Barrere, 1727

Giuseppe Guarneri del Gesù
 William Hagen - Sennhauser, ca. 1735
 Paul Huang - ex-Wieniawski, ca. 1742 
 Francisco Fullana - Mary Portman, ca. 1735
 Stephen Kim - Moller, cs. 1725

Other
 Joshua Brown - Pietro Guarneri, 1679
 Stephen Waarts - Pietro Guarneri II of Venice, ca. 1750
 Tim Fain - Francesco Gobetti Venice, ca. 1717
 Sandy Cameron - Pietro Guarneri of Venice, ca. 1735
 Elena Urioste - Alessandro Gagliano, ca. 1706
 Kenneth Liao - Nicolò Amati, ca. 1635-40
 Gao Can - Nicolò Amati Lobkowicz 1617
 Jonathon Moerschal – Gasparo da Saló, "Adam", 1590 (viola)
 Yang Lie - Guarneri School of Cremona. ca. 1740
 Tom Stone Jr. – Tonge; Scheinin, Carlo Bergonzi, ca. 1733
 Jisun Yang – Nicolò Gagliano, ca. 1750
 Richard Hirschl – Ferdinando Garimberti, 1923 (cello)
 Michala Høj – Robert Chen, Matteo Goffriller, ca. 1700
 Jason Issokson – Pietro Guarneri, ca. 1679
 Yang Liu – Guarnerius, ca. 1740
 Hanbin Yoo – Giovanni Paolo Maggini, ca. 1600
 Tai Murray – Petrius Merighi, 1772
 Axel Strauss – Taylor, Giovanni Francesco Pressenda 1845

See also
Stradivarius
John & Arthur Beare
Machold Rare Violins
List of Stradivarius instruments

References
 Stradivari Society - Official website

Music organizations based in the United States
Organizations based in Chicago
Organizations established in 1985
1985 establishments in Illinois